VA-96 was a short-lived Attack Squadron of the U.S. Navy. It was established on 30 June 1956, and disestablished less than two years later, on 10 April 1958. Its nickname is unknown.

Significant events
 Sep 1957: Kearsarge operated in the vicinity of Taiwan following the buildup of Chinese communist forces opposite the offshore islands belonging to Taiwan.

Home port assignments
The squadron was assigned to these home ports, effective on the dates shown:
 NAS Miramar – 30 Jun 1956
 NAS Moffett Field – Aug 1956

Aircraft assignment
The squadron first received the following aircraft on the dates shown:
 AD-6 Skyraider – Jul 1956
 AD-7 Skyraider – Mar 1957

See also
 Attack aircraft
 List of inactive United States Navy aircraft squadrons
 History of the United States Navy

References

Attack squadrons of the United States Navy
Wikipedia articles incorporating text from the Dictionary of American Naval Aviation Squadrons